Jaqué Airport  is an airport serving Jaqué, a Pacific coastal town in the Darién Province of Panama.

Northwest approach and departure will cross the Jaqué River. There are distant hills along the coast northwest and southeast of the airport.

Airlines and destinations

See also
Transport in Panama
List of airports in Panama

References

External links
 OpenStreetMap - Jaqué
 Aviation Safety Net - Jaqué
 OurAirports - Jaqué
  Google Maps - Jaqué
 FallingRain - Jaqué

Airports in Panama